David Crabb (December 13, 1975 - ) is an American actor and writer.  He was born in San Antonio, Texas and lived there until the middle of high school, when he moved to Seguin, Texas.  His experiences of being a "gay Goth teen in South Texas" were chronicled in his 2011 autobiographical one-man show, Bad Kid.  Bad Kid ran for several weeks at the Axis Theater in New York City in November 2011 and garnered critical praise. It made a second run from February 17, 2012, to March 10, 2012, and garnered more positive reviews from the New York theater community. Bad Kid was published as a memoir by Harper Perennial in 2015.

His second one-man show, $1800, premiered in New York City in November 2015 and chronicles finding $1800 on the street, his moral dilemma about what to do with it, along with life as a struggling actor in New York and chronic health issues.

Crabb graduated from Texas State University–San Marcos in 1997 and then got an MFA in Photography and Performance from Cranbook Academy of Art in 1999. He is two-time winner of The Moth storytelling slam and has appeared on stage and screen, and has also worked as a sound engineer. He was a regular member of the off-Broadway theater company Axis Company NYC as well as a producer and performer for Ask Me Stories and RISK! Show.

As of 2016, he resides in Los Angeles, CA with his husband, actor Jack Perry, and their dog.

References

External links

 

American male stage actors
American gay actors
1975 births
Living people
21st-century American LGBT people